Lord Thomas may refer to any of the following:

 John Thomas, Baron Thomas of Cwmgiedd (born 1947), British judge 
 Martin Thomas, Baron Thomas of Gresford (born 1937), Liberal Democrat peer, lawyer and former Deputy High Court judge
 Peter Thomas, Baron Thomas of Gwydir (1920-2008), Conservative politician
 Terence Thomas, Baron Thomas of Macclesfield (1937–2018) Labour Co-op peer and retired banker
 Miles Thomas, Baron Thomas of Remenham (1897–1980), peer and aviation executive
 Hugh Thomas, Baron Thomas of Swynnerton (1931–2017), Crossbench peer, historian and former diplomat

See also
 Susan Thomas, Baroness Thomas of Walliswood (born 1935) 
 Celia Thomas, Baroness Thomas of Winchester (born 1945)
 Dafydd Elis-Thomas (Baron Elis-Thomas) (born 1946)